Samba N'Diaye (born 30 November 1972 in Dakar, Senegal) is a French-Senegalese former professional footballer who played as a striker.

External links
Samba N'Diaye profile at chamoisfc79.fr

Samba N'Diaye profile at footballdatabase.eu

1972 births
Living people
French footballers
Senegalese footballers
Association football forwards
R.S.C. Anderlecht players
FC Metz players
AS Beauvais Oise players
Lille OSC players
AS Saint-Étienne players
FC Nantes players
Amiens SC players
Chamois Niortais F.C. players
AC Ajaccio players
Ligue 1 players
Ligue 2 players
Footballers from Dakar
Al-Shamal SC players
Ittihad FC players
Al-Nasr SC (Dubai) players
Sharjah FC players
UAE Pro League players
Saudi Professional League players
Qatar Stars League players